England and Scotland have been playing each other at rugby union since 1871 when Scotland beat England in the first ever rugby union international. A total of 141 matches have been played, with England having won 76 times, Scotland 46 times and nineteen matches have been drawn.

Apart from fixtures played in the Home/Five/Six Nations Championship competitions, two games have been played at the Rugby World Cup: the 1991 Semi-final and the 2011 Pool B fixture, both of which England were victorious. The sides also met in 1971 in a match to commemorate the centenary of the first match between the sides, which Scotland were victorious in both fixtures.

The 1938 Calcutta Cup match was the first live televised rugby international. It was broadcast by BBC Television. 

The first two international sides to play against each other, the England–Scotland fixture is the second most-played international rugby union match as of 2023. Behind the Australia–New Zealand rivalry by some thirty-plus matches (not including XV results), it is one match ahead of the England–Ireland match-up and the Ireland–Scotland match-up.

Calcutta Cup

The teams have consistently been competing for the Calcutta Cup annually since 1879, or their ninth match-up together. Used in a one-off match, the Cup first took part in the Home Nations friendlies of the 1870s and early '80s. It is now one trophy of many used between the six teams that make up the Six Nations Championship.

Summary
Note: Summary below reflects test results by both teams.

Overall

Records 
Note: Date shown in brackets indicates when the record was last set.

Results

References

 
England national rugby union team matches
Scotland national rugby union team matches
Rugby union rivalries in England
Rugby union rivalries in Scotland
England–Scotland relations
Six Nations Championship